Angelus Family may refer to:

 Isaac II Angelos
 Alexios III Angelos
 Alexios IV Angelos